In algebra (in particular in algebraic geometry or algebraic number theory), a valuation is a function on a field that provides a measure of the size or multiplicity of elements of the field. It generalizes to commutative algebra the notion of size inherent in consideration of the degree of a pole or multiplicity of a zero in complex analysis, the degree of divisibility of a number by a prime number in number theory, and the geometrical concept of contact between two algebraic or analytic varieties in algebraic geometry. A field with a valuation on it is called a valued field.

Definition 
One starts with the following objects:
a field  and its multiplicative group K×,
an abelian totally ordered group .
 for all  ∈ ,
 for all  ∈  .

which satisfies the following properties for all a, b in K:

 if and only if ,
,
, with equality if v(a) ≠ v(b).

A valuation v is trivial if v(a) = 0 for all a in K×, otherwise it is non-trivial.

The second property asserts that any valuation is a group homomorphism. The third property is a version of the triangle inequality on metric spaces adapted to an arbitrary Γ (see Multiplicative notation below). For valuations used in geometric applications, the first property implies that any non-empty germ of an analytic variety near a point contains that point. 

The valuation can be interpreted as the order of the leading-order term. The third property then corresponds to the order of a sum being the order of the larger term, unless the two terms have the same order, in which case they may cancel, in which case the sum may have larger order.

For many applications,  is an additive subgroup of the real numbers  in which case ∞ can be interpreted as +∞ in the extended real numbers; note that  for any real number a, and thus +∞ is the unit under the binary operation of minimum. The real numbers (extended by +∞) with the operations of minimum and addition form a semiring, called the min tropical semiring, and a valuation v is almost a semiring homomorphism from K to the tropical semiring, except that the homomorphism property can fail when two elements with the same valuation are added together.

Multiplicative notation and absolute values
The concept was developed by Emil Artin in his book Geometric Algebra writing the group in multiplicative notation as :

Instead of ∞, we adjoin a formal symbol O to Γ, with the ordering and group law extended by the rules
 for all  ∈  ,
 for all  ∈ .

satisfying the following properties for all a, b ∈ K:

 if and only if ,
,
, with equality if .

(Note that the directions of the inequalities are reversed from those in the additive notation.)

In this case, we may pass to the additive notation with value group  by taking .

Each valuation on  defines a corresponding linear preorder: .

Terminology
In this article, we use the terms defined above, in the additive notation. However, some authors use alternative terms: 
 our "valuation" (satisfying the ultrametric inequality) is called an "exponential valuation" or "non-Archimedean absolute value" or "ultrametric absolute value";
 our "absolute value" (satisfying the triangle inequality) is called a "valuation" or an "Archimedean absolute value".

Associated objects
There are several objects defined from a given valuation ;
the valuation ring Rv is the set of a ∈  with v(a) ≥ 0,
the prime ideal mv is the set of a ∈ K with v(a) > 0 (it is in fact a maximal ideal of Rv),
the residue field kv = Rv/mv,
the place of  associated to v, the class of v under the equivalence defined below.

Basic properties

Equivalence of valuations 
This is an equivalence relation.

Two valuations of K are equivalent if and only if they have the same valuation ring.

An equivalence class of valuations of a field is called a place. Ostrowski's theorem gives a complete classification of places of the field of rational numbers  these are precisely the equivalence classes of valuations for the p-adic completions of

Extension of valuations
The set of all such extensions is studied in the ramification theory of valuations.

Let L/K be a finite extension and let w be an extension of v to L. The index of Γv in Γw, e(w/v) = [Γw : Γv], is called the reduced ramification index of w over v. It satisfies e(w/v) ≤ [L : K] (the degree of the extension L/K). The relative degree of w over v is defined to be f(w/v) = [Rw/mw : Rv/mv] (the degree of the extension of residue fields). It is also less than or equal to the degree of L/K. When L/K is separable, the ramification index of w over v is defined to be e(w/v)pi, where pi is the inseparable degree of the extension Rw/mw over Rv/mv.

Complete valued fields 
When the ordered abelian group  is the additive group of the integers, the associated valuation is equivalent to an absolute value, and hence induces a metric on the field . If  is complete with respect to this metric, then it is called a complete valued field. If K is not complete, one can use the valuation to construct its completion, as in the examples below, and different valuations can define different completion fields.

There is a related property known as spherical completeness: it is equivalent to completeness if  but stronger in general.

Examples

p-adic valuation
The valuation group is the additive integers  For an integer  the valuation νp(a) measures the divisibility of a by powers of p:

and for a fraction, νp(a/b) = νp(a) − νp(b).

Writing this multiplicatively yields the -adic absolute value, which conventionally has as base , so .

Order of vanishing
Then the valuation ring R consists of rational functions with no pole at x = a, and the completion is the formal Laurent series ring F((x−a)). This can be generalized to the field of Puiseux series K{{t}} (fractional powers), the Levi-Civita field (its Cauchy completion), and the field of Hahn series, with valuation in all cases returning the smallest exponent of t appearing in the series.

-adic valuation 
Since every principal ideal domain is a unique factorization domain, every non-zero element a of  can be written (essentially) uniquely as

In particular, the integer ea is uniquely determined by a.

The π-adic valuation of K is then given by

If π' is another irreducible element of  such that (π') = (π) (that is, they generate the same ideal in R), then the π-adic valuation and the π'-adic valuation are equal. Thus, the π-adic valuation can be called the P-adic valuation, where P = (π).

 P-adic valuation on a Dedekind domain
The previous example can be generalized to Dedekind domains.

Vector spaces over valuation fields
Suppose that  ∪ {0} is the set of non-negative real numbers under multiplication. Then we say that the valuation is non-discrete if its range (the valuation group) is infinite (and hence has an accumulation point at 0).

Suppose that X is a vector space over K and that A and B are subsets of X. Then we say that A absorbs B if there exists a α ∈ K such that λ ∈ K and |λ| ≥ |α| implies that B ⊆ λ A. A is called radial or absorbing if A absorbs every finite subset of X. Radial subsets of X are invariant under finite intersection.  Also, A is called circled if λ in K and |λ| ≥ |α| implies λ A ⊆ A. The set of circled subsets of L is invariant under arbitrary intersections. The circled hull''' of A is the intersection of all circled subsets of X containing A.

Suppose that X and Y are vector spaces over a non-discrete valuation field K, let A ⊆ X, B ⊆ Y, and let f : X → Y be a linear map. If A is circled then so is f(A) but if A is radial then f(A) will be radial under the additional condition that f'' is surjective.

See also 
Discrete valuation
Euclidean valuation
Field norm
Absolute value (algebra)

Notes

References 

. A masterpiece on algebra written by one of the leading contributors.
Chapter VI of

External links 

Algebraic geometry
Field (mathematics)